Juliette Chantal Ah-Wan (born 29 April 1981) is a badminton player from Seychelles. Born in Victoria, Seychelles, Ah-Wan debuted in 1995 at the age of 14. In 2007, she awarded as Sportslady of the Year. Ah-Wan has competed in some international tournament, including 2008 Summer Olympics, and Commonwealth Games from 2002–2018.

Achievements

All-Africa Games 
Women's singles

Women's doubles

Mixed doubles

African Championships 
Women's singles

Women's doubles

Mixed doubles

BWF International Challenge/Series
Women's singles

Women's doubles

Mixed doubles

 BWF International Challenge tournament
 BWF International Series tournament
 BWF Future Series tournament

References

External links 
 
 
 
 
 

Seychellois female badminton players
Living people
1981 births
People from Greater Victoria, Seychelles
Badminton players at the 2008 Summer Olympics
Olympic badminton players of Seychelles
Badminton players at the 2002 Commonwealth Games
Badminton players at the 2006 Commonwealth Games
Badminton players at the 2010 Commonwealth Games
Badminton players at the 2014 Commonwealth Games
Badminton players at the 2018 Commonwealth Games
Commonwealth Games competitors for Seychelles
Competitors at the 2003 All-Africa Games
Competitors at the 2007 All-Africa Games
Competitors at the 2015 African Games
African Games gold medalists for Seychelles
African Games bronze medalists for Seychelles
African Games medalists in badminton